EG Australia is the Australian subsidiary of British company EG Group which operates the EG Ampol chain of petrol stations, selling Ampol (formerly Caltex Australia) fuel at its stations. , there are over 540 EG Ampol petrol stations. The service stations were acquired from Woolworths in April 2019 for $1.72 billion. 

Before the sale, the chain traded as Woolworths Plus Petrol (1996–2003) and Caltex Woolworths (2003–2022). In Victoria, the chain traded as Caltex Safeway until the mid-2010s after Woolworths scrapped the Safeway name in late 2008. Since the sale, the Woolworths-branded service stations were progressively rebranded into EG stations, ultimately rebranding to EG Ampol between July and December 2022.

History

Woolworths' foray into the petrol business began in 1996 with a Woolworths Plus Petrol station in Dubbo, New South Wales. In July 2001, Woolworths leased 69 of Liberty Oil's sites which were then converted to Woolworths Plus Petrol.  After the conversion, the number of Woolworths Plus Petrol sites increased to approximately 260, equating to approximately 8%  market share of the Australian petrol market.

In 2003, Woolworths announced a joint venture with Caltex. Caltex would supply fuel to the outlets and they would be co-branded.  All 305 Woolworths Plus Petrol and more than 130 selected Caltex sites near Woolworths supermarkets were rebranded accordingly.

In late 2014, Woolworths and Caltex revised the terms of their alliance, with the changes affecting the 131 Caltex-operated sites. 92 of the sites would be rebranded as either Star Mart or Star Shop convenience stores while continuing to accept the Woolworths fuel discount redemption while the remainder would exit the Caltex–Woolworths alliance entirely.  Another 12 sites were added to the Caltex redemption network in 2015 for a total of 104 Caltex operated sites accepting the Woolworths fuel discount.

In August 2016, Woolworths Rewards' members could collect points for every dollar spent in any Caltex Woolworths outlet for the first time, in addition to the already-existing fuel discount offer.

In December 2016, Woolworths announced it would sell its own operated sites to BP for $1.75 billion, and would enter into a franchise agreement to retain its branded stores at the sites. The Australian Competition & Consumer Commission (ACCC) blocked the deal in August 2017 over concerns it would reduce competition and result in motorists paying more for petrol. BP pulled out of the deal in July 2018, saying the concessions that would have been required to satisfy the ACCC would make the deal commercially unviable.

On 7 November 2018, it was announced that 125 Caltex sites had begun accepting the Woolworths fuel discount redemption, and 680 Caltex sites had also begun to allow Woolworths Rewards' members to earn points, joining the existing network of 538 Caltex Woolworths sites and 104 Caltex operated sites. Two days later, on 9 November 2018, Woolworths announced it would sell its 540 stores to the British company EG Group for $1.72 billion. Woolworths said it would enter a 15-year agreement with EG that would maintain its fuel discount redemption across the network, and enable Woolworths Rewards points to be earned on fuel transactions across its network. Woolworths would also sell wholesale food and groceries to the chain of service stations under the agreement. The acquisition was completed on 1 April 2019.

In May 2020, Caltex was rebranded as Ampol. In late 2020, EG sued Ampol regarding the latter's rebranding, accusing them of "misleading or deceptive conduct". When EG acquired the stores from Woolworths, it also inherited the fuel supply agreement which allowed the use of the Caltex brand. EG accused Ampol of making "false representations" about the status of the latter's branding agreement with Chevron in that the then-Caltex Australia could use the Caltex brand for a long time. EG also accused Ampol for failing to disclose that the latter was already locked in discussions with Chevron about the future of the trademark licence agreement. The legal dispute was mutually resolved in April 2022 with all legal proceedings dropped. The resolution allowed Ampol to continue to be the exclusive supplier to all EG stores under the agreement, and paved the way for the rebranding from Caltex to Ampol in EG stores.

Fuel discount offer
As part of the agreement between EG Group and Woolworths, EG Australia and Caltex Woolworths service stations continue to offer a 4¢ per litre discount off the pump price for customers who present a fuel voucher in the form of a docket, their Everyday Rewards loyalty card (formerly Woolworths Rewards) or their Everyday Rewards app, obtained after spending a qualifying amount of $30 or more at Woolworths supermarkets and Tasmanian Big W department stores. Before September 2010, fuel dockets also could be obtained after spending at Big W nationwide. The 4¢ per litre discount can be doubled to 8¢ if the fuel customer also spends at least $5 of goods at the service station's store, and pays for both fuel and goods in the same transaction.

When the offer was first introduced in the 1990s, it initially involved an escalating scale of discount off the price of petrol, depending on the amount spent to qualify – $30-$60 for 2¢ per litre, $60-$150 for 4¢ per litre, and $150 and above for 6¢ per litre.  However, the offer eventually settled on a median 4¢ per litre discount with purchases of $30.00 and over, after the launch of rival Coles' equivalent fuel discount offer through Coles Express service stations in 2003.

See also

List of automotive fuel retailers
List of convenience stores

References

External links
 

Automotive fuel retailers in Australia
Chevron Corporation brands
Joint ventures
Retail companies established in 2003
Energy companies established in 2003
Non-renewable resource companies established in 2003
Woolworths Group (Australia)
2019 mergers and acquisitions